Charles John Brydges (23 February 1827 in London, England – 16 February 1889 in Winnipeg) the son of Thomas and Mary Brydges.  He was baptized on 30 May 1827 at Saint Leonards, Shoreditch, London, England. As a young man he learned railway management with the London and South Western Railway. In 1852 he came to Canada to become the managing director of the Great Western Railroad which was incorporated to build a line from Burlington Bay to Lake Huron. From 1862 to 1874 he was general manager of the competing Grand Trunk Railway. Afterwards he became one of the Commissioners of the Intercolonial Railway which connected Montreal, Quebec, with Halifax, Nova Scotia.  From 1879 until his death he was a Land Commissioner for the Hudson's Bay Company in Winnipeg.

The town Mount Brydges, Ontario, is named in his honour.

References 

 The Letters of Charles John Brydges, 1879-1882, Hudson's Bay Company Land Commissioner edited by Hartwell Bowsfield. Hudson's Bay Record Society, Volume 31, Winnipeg, 1977.
 The Letters of Charles John Brydges, 1883-1889 by E. J. Rea (1981).
 "'In a Business Way': C. J. Brydges and the Hudson's Bay Company, 1879–89," by Alan Wilson in The West and the Nation, edited by Carl Berger and Ramsay Cook (1976), pages 114-139.
 Biography at the Dictionary of Canadian Biography Online
 Biography at the Manitoba Historical Society)

British railway entrepreneurs
1827 births
1889 deaths
Canadian railway executives
19th-century British businesspeople